Ciliopagurus tenebrarum is a species of hermit crab native to Cape Comorin.

References

Hermit crabs
Crustaceans described in 1905